The World Ladies Championship Salonpas Cup is one of the four major golf tournaments for women on the LPGA of Japan Tour. It was founded in 1973 by Nippon Television and has been classified as a major since 2008. The annual tournament is held at the Ibaraki Golf Club in Tsukubamirai, Ibaraki, and Hisamitsu Pharmaceutical serves as the title sponsor.

Tournament names
1973–1984: World Ladies Golf Tournament
1985–1986: Roku Konishi Cup World Ladies Golf Tournament
1987–1992: Konica Cup World Ladies Golf Tournament
1993: World Ladies Golf Tournament
1994–1999: Gunze Cup World Ladies Golf Tournament
2000–2004: Nichirei Cup World Ladies Golf Tournament
2005–2007: Salonpas World Ladies Golf Tournament
2008–present: World Ladies Championship Salonpas Cup

Winners 
2022 Miyū Yamashita
2021 Yuna Nishimura
2020 Cancelled
2019 Hinako Shibuno
2018 Jiyai Shin
2017 Kim Ha-neul
2016 Lexi Thompson
2015 Chun In-gee
2014 Misuzu Narita
2013 Hiromi Mogi
2012 Ahn Sun-ju
2011 Ahn Sun-ju
2010 Morgan Pressel
2009 Shinobu Moromizato
2008 Akiko Fukushima
2007 Jeon Mi-jeong
2006 Shiho Oyama
2005 Yuri Fudoh
2004 Rui Kitada
2003 Annika Sörenstam
2002 Yuri Fudoh
2001 Karrie Webb
2000 Karrie Webb
1999 Yoko Inoue
1998 Liselotte Neumann
1997 Tseng Hsiu-feng
1996 Haga Yukiyo
1995 Kaori Higo
1994 Won Jae-sook
1993 Mayumi Hirase
1992 Yuuko Moriguchi
1991 Beth Daniel
1990 Beth Daniel
1989 Fukumi Tani
1988 Kayoko Ikoma
1987 Ayako Okamoto
1986 Casey Chan
1985 Ai-Yu Tu
1984 Cai Lixiang
1983 Tomiko Ikebuchi
1982 Ai-Yu Tu
1981 Jan Stephenson
1980 Masako Sasaki
1979 Beth Daniel
1978 Yuko Moriguchi
1977 Ayako Okamoto
1976 Jane Blalock
1975 Jane Blalock
1974 Hisako Higuchi
1973 Hisako Higuchi

External links
 

LPGA of Japan Tour events
Sport in Ibaraki Prefecture
1973 establishments in Japan
Recurring sporting events established in 1973
Nippon TV original programming